Palaemon is a genus of caridean shrimp of the family Palaemonidae. The conventional circumscription of the genus Palaemon is probably paraphyletic. Molecular data suggest that Palaemonetes, as well as the genera Exopalaemon and Couteriella, are nested within Palaemon. Phylogenetic affinities in these groups correspond better with geographical origin than conventional genus assignments.

Members
The genus contains the following species:

Palaemon adspersus Rathke, 1837
Palaemon affinis H. Milne-Edwards, 1837
Palaemon capensis (De Man in M. Weber, 1897)
Palaemon carteri (Holthuis, 1950)
Palaemon concinnus Dana, 1852 (mangrove prawn)
Palaemon curvirostris Nguyên, 1992
Palaemon debilis Dana, 1852
Palaemon dolospinus Walker & Poore, 2003
Palaemon elegans Rathke, 1837 (rockpool prawn)
Palaemon floridanus Chace, 1942 (Florida grass shrimp)
Palaemon gladiator Holthuis, 1950
Palaemon gracilis (Smith, 1871)
Palaemon gravieri (Yu, 1930)
Palaemon guangdongensis Liu, Liang & Yan, 1990
Palaemon hancocki Holthuis, 1950
Palaemon intermedius (Stimpson, 1860)
Palaemon ivonicus Carvalho, Magalhães, & Mantelatto, 2014
Palaemon khori De Grave & Al-Maslamani, 2006
Palaemon litoreus (McCulloch, 1909)
Palaemon longirostris H. Milne-Edwards, 1837
Palaemon macrodactylus Rathbun, 1902
Palaemon maculatus (Thallwitz, 1892)
Palaemon modestus (Heller, 1862)
Palaemon miyadii (Kubo, 1938)
Palaemon northropi (Rankin, 1898)
Palaemon ogasawaraensis Kato & Takeda, 1981
Palaemon ortmanni Rathbun, 1902
Palaemon pacificus (Stimpson, 1860)
Palaemon paivai Fausto Filho, 1967
Palaemon pandaliformis (Stimpson, 1871)
Palaemon paucidens De Haan, 1844
Palaemon peringueyi (Stebbing, 1915)
Palaemon peruanus Holthuis, 1950
Palaemon powelli Ashelby & De Grave, 2009
Palaemon ritteri Holmes, 1895
Palaemon semmelinkii (De Man, 1881)
Palaemon serenus Heller, 1862
Palaemon serratus (Pennant, 1777) (common prawn)
Palaemon serrifer (Stimpson, 1860)
Palaemon sewelli (Kemp, 1925)
Palaemon tenuidactylus Liu, Liang & Yan, 1990
Palaemon vicinus Ashelby, 2009
Palaemon varians Leach, 1813
Palaemon xiphias Risso, 1816
Palaemon yamashitai Fujino & Miyake, 1970
Palaemon yuna Carvalho, Magalhães, & Mantelatto, 2014

References

Palaemonidae
Decapod genera